The following is a list of notable people associated with Earlham College, located in the American city of Richmond, Indiana.

Notable alumni

A–M
 Carl W. Ackerman — first head of the Columbia University School of Journalism
 Marjorie Hill Allee – author
 Warder Clyde Allee – known for his research on animal behavior, protocooperation, and for identifying the Allee effect; elected to the National Academy of Sciences
 John S. Allen – founding president of the University of South Florida; interim president of the University of Florida
 Gertrude Bonnin (Zitkala-Sä) – writer, Native American activist, founded National Council of Indian Americans
 Elizabeth Burchinal – authority on American folk dance, especially for women and children
 Greg Burdwood – State Legislator in the New Hampshire House of Representatives
 Rick Carter – head football coach, College of the Holy Cross; his 1983 team remains the only Holy Cross team to ever qualify for the NCAA Division I-AA playoffs; N.C.A.A. Division I-AA Coach of the Year
 Al Cobine – big band leader and tenor saxophonist; worked closely with Henry Mancini and often associated with the Pink Panther theme song
 Jana E. Compton – research ecologist with the Environmental Protection Agency
 Joseph John Copeland – former president of City College of New York
 Ione Virginia Hill Cowles - president, General Federation of Women's Clubs
 Garfield V. Cox – attended but did not graduate; Dean of the University of Chicago School of Business, 1942–1952.
 David W. Dennis – Congressman from Indiana
 Juan Dies – co-founder and executive director of Sones de Mexico Ensemble; nominated for a Latin Grammy
 Christoper Dilts – Senior Photographer at Obama for America 2012
 Joseph M. Dixon – Congressman, Senator, 7th Governor of Montana
 Liza Donnelly – cartoonist for the New Yorker
 John Porter East – former U.S. Senator for North Carolina
 Brigadier General Bonner F. Fellers – General MacArthur's psychological warfare director during World War II; during the subsequent occupation of Japan, worked with fellow Earlhamite Isshiki Yuri (see below) to persuade MacArthur to preserve the institution of the Emperor and clear Emperor Hirohito of war crimes
 Jim Fowler – star of Wild Kingdom
 Lew Frederick (Lewis Reed Frederick) – member of the Oregon House of Representatives 2010–2016; Member Oregon State Senate 2017–Present;  Outstanding Alumni Award 2013
 Reverend Wilda C.Gafney - American priest and bible scholar. 
 Sara Gelser – member of the Oregon House of Representatives 2005-2014 and member of the Oregon State Senate 2015–present) Outstanding Alumni Award 2016; Recognized as one of Time Magazine's "Person of the Year" Silence Breakers in 2017
 Andrew Ginther – Mayor of Columbus, Ohio, 2016–present
 Robert Graham – Endowed Chair, Department of Family Medicine, University of Cincinnati Medical Center; elected to the National Academy of Sciences, Institute of Medicine
 Tim Grimm – played FBI agent Dan Murray alongside Harrison Ford in the film Clear and Present Danger (1994)
 David Grosso — City Council Member for the District of Columbia
 Mary Haas – linguist, pioneer in the field of Siamese language studies; former President of the Linguistic Society of America
 William Hadley – established the Hadley School for the Blind
 Michael C. Hall – actor on HBO's Six Feet Under and star of Showtime's Dexter, for which he was nominated for an Emmy and won Golden Globe and Screen Actors Guild awards
 Margaret Hamilton – headed the team that wrote the onboard flight software for NASA's Apollo program
 Robert M. Hirsch – former Chief Hydrologist and head of water science for the United States Geological Survey
 Emily Caroline Chandler Hodgin – temperance reformer
 Mary Inda Hussey – Semitic text authority; first woman to teach at the American Society for Oriental Research in Jerusalem
 John Herndon James – Chief Justice of the 4th Court of Civil Appeals in San Antonio
 C. Francis Jenkins – demonstrated the first practical motion picture projector
 Walter Jessup – former head of the Carnegie Corporation and president of the University of Iowa
 Henry Underwood Johnson – US Congressman from Indiana
 Robert Underwood Johnson – former US Ambassador to Italy
 Andrew Johnston – film critic for Time Out New York, Us Weekly, Radar magazine; Editor of the "Time In" section; TV critic for Time Out New York
 Joseph Henry Kibbey – Territorial Governor of Arizona
 Peter D. Klein – chaired Rutgers University's Department of Philosophy
 Frances Moore Lappé – activist and author of three-million-copy bestseller Diet for a Small Planet
 Simone Leigh – noted multimedia and ceramic artist
 Maurice Manning – Pulitzer Prize finalist poet
 Howard Marmon – former president of the American Society of Automotive Engineers
 Manning Marable – professor at Columbia University; author of Malcolm X: A Life of Reinvention, which won a Pulitzer Prize in 2012
 Edward Matney – received an Emmy for a 1998 segment of Nightline on the Clinton White House
 Dan McCoy – writer for The Daily Show and host of The Flop House podcast
 Elephant Micah (real name Joseph O'Connell) – lo-fi recording artist
 Morris Hadley Mills – Indiana State Senator
 Molly R. Morris – ecologist, professor at Ohio University

N–Z
 William Penn Nixon – publisher of the Chicago Inter Ocean and president of the Associated Press
 Larry Overman – organic chemist, member of the National Academy of Sciences
 Josh Penn – producer of  Beasts of the Southern Wild, which won the narrative grand jury prize and the cinematography award at the Sundance Film Festival in January 2012 and was nominated for  the Best Picture Oscar in 2013
 Robert Quine – named by Rolling Stone as one of the 100 greatest guitarists of all time
 Marc Reisner – author of the books A Dangerous Place and Cadillac Desert
 David Rovics – singer/songwriter and activist
 José Royo – CEO of Ascent Media Group, a provider of large-scale digital services to creative media companies, including film studios
 Olive Rush – artist
 Rock Scully – manager of The Grateful Dead 1965–1985
 Andrea Seabrook – contributor to National Public Radio's All Things Considered and former Congressional correspondent for NPR
 David Shear – US Ambassador to Vietnam
 William E. Simkin – helped prevent national strikes and resolved thousands of labor disputes as the federal government's chief labor mediator and as a leading private arbitrator
 Ruth Hinshaw Spray – peace activist
 Wendell Meredith Stanley – biochemist, shared a 1946 Nobel Prize for discovering methods of producing pure enzymes and virus proteins
 Laura Sessions Stepp – Pulitzer Prize–winning journalist for The Washington Post
 Edwin Way Teale – naturalist writer; won the Pulitzer Prize for General Non-Fiction in 1966; elected fellow of the American Association for the Advancement of Science; staff writer at Popular Science
 Ralph Waldo Trueblood – Editor-in-Chief of The Los Angeles Times (1934–37); co-inventor of the telephotographer, the first device used by newspapers for sending pictures by wire
 Thomas Trueblood – President of the National Society of Elocutionists; his golf teams won two NCAA National Championships and five Big Ten Conference championships
 Harold Urey – received the Chemistry Nobel prize in 1934; known for his discovery of deuterium and the Miller–Urey experiment
 Frederick Van Nuys – U.S. Senator from Indiana 1932–1944
 Amy Walters – producer, National Public Radio
 Zach Warren – ran the Boston Marathon while juggling in 2 hours, fifty-eight minutes
 Newton K. Wesley – Japanese American optometrist; early developer of commercially successful rigid contact lenses in the 1950s
 Herman Brenner White – physicist
 Don Wildman – actor and host of TV travel shows including Ushuaia, Men's Journal and Cities of the Underworld on The History Channel
 Harry N. Wright – President of City College of New York, mathematician

Notable faculty

 William W. Biddle – social scientist and a major contributor to the study of community development and propaganda
 Landrum Bolling – President of Earlham from 1958 to 1973; Director at Large of Mercy Corps; back channel between Yasir Arafat and Jimmy Carter
 Wayne C. Booth – former Professor of English; literary critic; author of The Rhetoric of Fiction and The Company We Keep
 Anna Cox Brinton and Howard Brinton – Quaker scholars and administrators
 John Elwood Bundy – impressionist painter
 Evan Ira Farber – Emeritus Library Director, named Academic Research Librarian of the Year in 1980
 Del Harris – former Earlham basketball coach; current NBA coach
 Robert L. Kelly – former Earlham College president, made Chevalier of the Legion of Honor by the French government
 Thomas R. Kelly – author of A Testament of Devotion
 Dale Edwin Noyd – decorated fighter pilot and Air Force captain who became a conscientious objector during the Vietnam War
 E. Merrill Root – poet
 Peter Suber – Professor of Philosophy Emeritus, creator of the game Nomic, and a leader in the open access movement
 D. Elton Trueblood – Quaker author and theologian

References

External links
 Earlham College Alumni Association website
 Earlham Outstanding Alumni Award recipients

Earlham College people